Railway Wood may refer to:

 Railway Wood (County Durham), a woodland in County Durham, England
 Railway Wood (Ypres), a woodland near Ypres, Belgium 
 RE Grave, Railway Wood, a war cemetery and memorial near Ypres, Belgium